Centennial High School is a public high school located in Bakersfield, California, United States. The school's opening in 1993 marked the 100-year anniversary of the Kern High School District. Centennial is the home of many nationally recognized extra-curricular academic programs, including Virtual Business and We The People, both of which have finished ranked in the top five nationally in the school's history. In 2011, Centennial was recognized as a California Distinguished School for achieving an Academic Performance Index score of 850, the highest in the Kern High School District.

Centennial's boys and girls athletic teams are known as the Golden Hawks. As part of the Southwest Yosemite League, the Golden Hawks compete in baseball, basketball, cross country, football, soccer, swimming & diving, tennis, track & field, volleyball, and wrestling. Centennial's athletic teams have won numerous league and CIF Central Section championships. The girls varsity volleyball team won the California state championship in 1996.

Notable alumni and faculty
 Cody Kessler, NFL quarterback
 Megan Langenfeld, softball player
 Jarret Martin, minor league baseball player
 Brent Morel, former MLB third baseman
 Jared Norris, NFL linebacker
 Matt Barnes (soccer), former head coach of the Turks and Caicos Islands Men's National Soccer Team
 Corbin Burnes, MLB pitcher

References

High schools in Bakersfield, California
Public high schools in California
Educational institutions established in 1993
1993 establishments in California